The 2005–06 season was the 17th season in the history of UD Almería and the club's fourth consecutive season in the second division of Spanish football. In addition to the domestic league, UD Almería participated in this season's edition of the Copa del Rey.

Pre-season and friendlies

Competitions

Overall record

Segunda División

League table

Results summary

Results by round

Matches

Copa del Rey

References

UD Almería seasons
Almería